High Rock is a hill in Nipissing District of Northeastern Ontario, Canada, located  southwest of the village of Temagami. The highest point on High Rock Island, it is one of many scenic viewpoints on Lake Temagami.

High Rock, along with Devil Mountain and Maple Mountain, is considered sacred to the Temagami First Nation.

References

Sacred mountains
Landforms of Temagami
Mountains of Ontario
Mountains of Canada under 1000 metres